Peter Milne may refer to:

 Peter Milne (musician) (1824–1908), Scottish violinist and composer
 Peter Milne (missionary) (1834–1924), Scottish missionary
 Peter Milne (screenwriter) (1896–1968), American screenwriter
 Peter Milne (boat designer) (1934–2008), British boat designer
 Peter Milne (visual artist) (born 1960), Australian photographer